Grimes-Crotts Mill, also known as Eureka Mills, Old Mill, Crotts Mill, is a historic grist mill located near Reedy Creek, Davidson County, North Carolina. It was built between 1870 and 1880, and is a 2 1/2-story, frame mill on a foundation of fieldstone and massive timber pilings.  It is sheathed in plain weatherboard and has a monitor roof.  The mill machinery was removed in 1937.

It was added to the National Register of Historic Places in 1984.

References

Grinding mills in North Carolina
Grinding mills on the National Register of Historic Places in North Carolina
Industrial buildings completed in 1880
Buildings and structures in Davidson County, North Carolina
National Register of Historic Places in Davidson County, North Carolina
1880 establishments in North Carolina